The third season of The Real Housewives of Potomac, an American reality television series, is broadcast on Bravo. It premiered on April 1, 2018, and is primarily filmed in Potomac, Maryland. Its executive producers are Steven Weinstock,
Glenda Hersh, Lauren Eskelin, Lorraine Haughton-Lawson, Thomas Kelly, and Andy Cohen.

The third season of The Real Housewives of Potomac focuses on the lives of Gizelle Bryant, Ashley Darby, Robyn Dixon, Karen Huger, Monique Samuels and Candiace Dillard.

Cast and synopsis
All six housewives featured during the second season returned as housewives, however, original housewife Charrisse Jackson-Jordan returned in a recurring capacity. Candiace Dillard, a former Miss United States, joined the series as a full-time housewife.

This season saw Karen deal with endless questions from the other ladies around her husband's company's tax issues detailed in the press. Her constant deflecting leads to tensions in her friendships with Gizelle and Ashley. Meanwhile, Gizelle deals with her relationship with Sherman and whether he's ready to commit long-term.

Monique struggles with balancing home life and her ever growing commitments outside of her marriage, including starting up her new lifestyle website for moms. Following a car accident, rumours between the group spread about her drinking habits. This causes conflict between Monique and Robyn who feels the former is making unprovoked attacks. Robyn continues to work on her relationship with ex-husband Juan.

Following a trial separation, Ashley and Michael move back in together as they try to rebuild their marriage. They face continuing problems as Ashley's mother and the financial help she receives from them, divides the couple. 

Newcomer Candiace is focused on planning her upcoming wedding, dealing with an overbearing mother whilst trying to form friendships with the other ladies. Whilst Karen takes her under wing, she struggles connecting with the others.

 During her appearance at the reunion, Jackson-Jordan sits on the end of the right couch, next to Dixon.

Episodes

References

External links

 
 
 

The Real Housewives of Potomac
2018 American television seasons